William Delday (July 25, 1913 – December 11, 1979) was a politician from Alberta, Canada. He served in the Legislative Assembly of Alberta from 1959 to 1967 as a member of the Social Credit caucus in government.

Political career
Delday first ran for a seat in the Alberta Legislature in the 1959 general election. He stood as the Social Credit candidate in the electoral district of Bow Valley-Empress. He defeated incumbent MLA Bryce Stringam by a comfortable majority to pick up the seat for his party.

In the 1963 general election Delday won a three-way race with a large majority.

Delday retired from the Assembly at dissolution in 1967.

References

External links
Legislative Assembly of Alberta Members Listing

Alberta Social Credit Party MLAs
1979 deaths
1913 births